Kokkola Futis 10 is a women's football club based in Kokkola, Finland. It was established in 2010 as the successor of KPV Kokkola's women's section. Kokkola F10 plays currently in the Finnish women's premier division Naisten Liiga.

Squad 2013 
As of 22 June 2013.

External links 
Kokkola Futis 10 Official Homepage

Women's football clubs in Finland
Kokkola
Association football clubs established in 2010